Walter Robert Fuchs (March 18, 1937 in Princeton – 21 July, 1976 in Munich) was  an American-German science communicator and science popularizer.

Life and work 
Fuchs was born in Princeton, where his father worked as a bank clerk. He went to Memmingen school (graduating in 1956), was trained as an electrician and mechanic, and then studied electrical engineering at the Munich Technical University as well as physics, mathematics and philosophy at the Ludwig Maximilian University of Munich. With a dissertation on "Logical problems of classical mechanics and quantum theory", he received his doctorate in 1961. In 1962 he was business editor at television program of Bavarian Radio studios, and since 1965 he had headed the editorial of Applied Science and Technology. Fuchs spent his life in Munich and died at the age of 39 from cancer. 

Fuchs wrote mostly in German; his books were translated into English and other languages and met an internationally wide audience. In 1970, his books had a total circulation of 750,000 sold copies, especially for math and science subjects.  Modern mathematics was translated into fourteen languages, as in the later 1960s, and it helped to popularize the concepts of sets theory.

Fuchs was a trained artist and supplied many of the templates for the illustrations of his own works; in his time in Munich, he played clarinet and saxophone in various jazz bands. In 1972 he published his satire The Dogs Planet, a fiction novel.

Bibliography 
 Logical Investigations to problems in classical mechanics and quantum theory (dissertation) 1961
 Knaurs book of modern mathematics Droemer / Knaur, 1966, 1972 (translated into English: Mathematics for the modern mind, MacMillan 1967).
 Knaurs book of modern physics. Droemer / Knaur 1965th
 Knaurs Book of thinking machines -. Information theory and cybernetics Knaur 1968th
 Knaurs book of electronics.
 Parents discover the new mathematics. Quantities and numbers 1970th
 Knaurs book of the New Learning. 1969th
 Parents discover the new logic.
 And Muhammad is their prophet -. The Arabs and their world 1975th
 Rebus from the drawing board - an introduction to the modern philosophy Knaur 1972 (on analytic philosophy)..
 Before the earth moved - a world history of physics DVA 1975th.
 Formula and fantasy -. A world history of mathematics DVA 1977 (the book was never finished and treated essentially only the antiquity), rororo 1979th
 Life under distant suns? Droemer / Knaur 1973rd
 The Dog Planet -. Canedusische thought one story Droemer / Knauer 1973rd
 Poetry as editor of our mid-century, Kösel Verlag 1965 (with interpretations of fox).

References 

German science writers
1937 births
1976 deaths